Ukhiya is an upazila of Cox's Bazar District in the Division of Chittagong, Bangladesh.

Geography
It has 19,189 households and a total area of 261.8 km2.

Demographics
As of the 2011 Bangladesh census, Ukhia has a population of 207,379. Males constitute 51.45% of the population, and females 48.55%. This Upazila's eighteen up population is 51749. Ukhia has an average literacy rate of 16.8% (7+ years), and the national average of 32.4% literate.

Administration
Ukhia Upazila is divided into five union parishads: Holdia Palong, Jalia Palong, Raja Palong, Ratna Palong, and Palong Khali. The union parishads are subdivided into 13 mauzas and 54 villages.

Education
High schools: Thaingkhali high school [Balukhali Kashemia High School], Abul Kashem Noor Jahan Chowdhury High School, Palong Model High School, Ukhiya govt. High School Rumkha Palong High School, Sonar Para High School, Kutupalong High School, Jalia palong High school, Bhalukia Palong High School. Rumkha Palong Hatirguna Shaira Govt. Primary School, Bhalukia Palong Govt. Primary School, Kutupalong Primary School.
Monkhali Chakma_para gov't. primary school. Moricha Phalong High School. Shaleh Bulbul govt. Primary School. Nolbania govt. Primary School.

Hospital

 Upazila Health Complex, Ukhia.
 Origin Hospital - The first private hospital in Ukhia Upazila dedicated to the service of the people.
 Ukhiya Specialized Hospital

Media
http://www.ukhiyanews.com

 http://www.sstvnews.com - SSTV the first online television channel in the upazila, has been providing regular entertainment and objective news.It was founded by Robioul Hasan Shimul.

Voluntary organizations

Hasighor Foundation
Uriya Open Scout Group 
 WAFA (we are for all)
 Hasi Mukh Foundation
 Ukhiya blood donation unit
 YOU (youth organization of ukhiya)
 PROTTASHA
 Taipalong Adorso Somiti
 Taipalong jhubo shomprithi

NGO working
CARE Bangladesh, MSF (Doctors without Borders),SHED (Society for Health Extension & Development), Brac, Pulse Bangladesh, Nacom, Muslim Aid, Uddipon, Rtm, Tai, Msf, Save the children, IOM, Mukti cox's Bazar, ACF, DRC, Ipsa, Codec, aid comilla etc. Caritas Bangladesh, Muslim Hands International, NRC.

Notable people
Obaidullah Hamzah, Islamic scholar and economist

Mohammad Yeasin Sikder. [Entrepreneur],{Founder Hasighor Foundation}

See also
 Upazilas of Bangladesh
 Districts of Bangladesh
 Divisions of Bangladesh

References

Upazilas of Cox's Bazar District